The Bundestag is the German federal parliament, and the only federal representative body that is directly elected by the German people. It was established in 1949 by the Basic Law for the Federal Republic of Germany and is the historical successor to the Reichstag. The Second German Bundestag came into being in 1953 and ended in 1957.

Dates of Session
1953-1957
The 2nd Bundestag convened in Bonn on 6 October 1953.
The session ended on 6 October 1957.

Coalitions
CDU/CSU and FDP form coalition (311 seats, 63.9%) to reelect Konrad Adenauer as Chancellor of Germany

Major political events
Bundestag reelects Hermann Ehlers as the second President of the Bundestag, 6 October 1953
Bundestag reelects Konrad Adenauer Chancellor of Germany, 6 October 1953.
Upon Ehlers' death, Bundestag elects Eugen Gerstenmaier third President of the Bundestag, 16 November 1954
Bundestag passes first reform of state-funded pension system
Bundestag ratifies Treaty of Rome
In 1955, constitution is amended to allow for defensive military and conscription over the strong opposition of the SPD minority
Germany joins the NATO

Officers
President of the Bundestag - Hermann Ehlers, Eugen Gerstenmaier

Seats by Party

References
Bundestag Election Results (German)
Bundestag History from German Wikipedia

002
1953 establishments in West Germany
1957 disestablishments in West Germany